Joseph-Jean-Felix Aubert (20 August 1849 – 23 May 1924) was a French painter.

Biography
Joseph Aubert married the daughter of the mathematician Jean Claude Bouquet in 1872. In 1873, he was admitted to the Ecole des Beaux-Arts in Paris in the studio of Alexandre Cabanel. He specialized in religious painting and stained glass design.

He notably decorated frescoes the churches Notre-Dame des Champs in Paris and Notre-Dame de Besançon.

Gallery

References

1849 births
1924 deaths